Blomstedt is a Swedish surname. Notable people with the surname include:

Georg Blomstedt (1872–1933), Swedish actor
Henrik Blomstedt (1921–2009), Finnish lawyer and diplomat
Herbert Blomstedt (born 1927), Swedish conductor
Jussi Blomstedt (1908–1985), Finnish conductor
Kaarlo Blomstedt (1880–1949), Finnish historian and archivist
Pauli E. Blomstedt (1900–1935), Finnish architect
Yrjö Blomstedt (1926–1994), Finnish historian

Swedish-language surnames